Cape Malyi Fontan (sometime translated as Small Fontan) is a cape in the central part of the Gulf of Odessa. It is located in the centre of the City of Odessa, in the site of Arkadia. The Hydrobiological Station of the Odessa University is located on the cape.

External links
 Cape Malyi Fontan

Malyi Fontan